Roger Carter II (born October 23, 1969) is an American former professional stock car racing driver and team owner. He has previously competed in the ARCA Menards Series from 2006 to 2015.

Racing career
Carter would attempt to make his first ARCA Re/Max Series race in 2006, driving for his own team in the No. 60 Chevrolet at Iowa Speedway, but ultimately failed to qualify for the event. He would attempt to make his debut the next year in 2007 with his own team again, with his first attempt being at the season opener at Daytona International Speedway, where he would not qualify for. His second attempt that year was originally scheduled at USA International Speedway, a race where he would withdraw from due to a "personal injury" and would be replaced by Nick Tucker. After not attempting any races in 2008, Carter would once again attempt to make the season opener at Daytona in 2009 in the No. 54 Dodge for Sherry Bell, but would fail to qualify.

In 2011, Carter would finally make his ARCA debut at Michigan Speedway driving the No. 40 Dodge for his own team, where he would finish 38th after two laps due to an engine issue. He would make three more starts throughout the year with a best finish of 16th at Madison International Speedway. In the next year, he would run seven races on the schedule, failing to finish in all his starts that year.

For 2013, Carter would run all but one race of the schedule in 2013 (that being at Chicagoland Speedway, driving his self owned No. 97 Dodge. During the course of the season, he would achieve eight top-20 finishes, including a top 10 at Michigan where he would finish eighth on the lead lap. Carter would run a partial schedule in 2014, primarily the No. 40 and No. 97 entries for his own team, and would have a best finish of eleventh at Pocono Raceway. Carter would run only one race in 2015, driving at Daytona in the No. 40 Dodge, finishing 32nd and five laps down to race winner Grant Enfinger. This would be his most recent ARCA event as a driver.

Team ownership
Carter owned and operated a team in the ARCA Racing Series named Carter 2 Motorsports with his wife Dana from 2006 to 2015, and primarily ran in Dodges driven by a multitude of drivers such as Bobby Hamilton Jr., Nick Tucker, Carl Long, Dominick Casola, Larry Barford Jr., and others.

In 2011, the team would run under the name Carter/Eminem Motorsports, supposedly a partnership with American rapper Eminem, who would be providing additional funding, although no other details were released during that time.

In 2014, the team had announced that former NASCAR driver Bobby Hamilton Jr. would drive for them full time in the No. 40, although they would mutually agree to split before the first race. Despite this, they would team up again for 2015, originally planning for Hamilton Jr. to run full-time in the No. 97, although Hamilton Jr. would depart the team after the tenth round at Chicagoland Speedway.

In 2022, Carter and Mike Affarano announced that they would run two races in the Camping World Truck Series season in a Chevrolet, although they would not make an attempt during the season, as their truck, which Carter claimed was a "brand new Ronnie Hopkins" truck, the body style was a 2014-15 spec truck, which had been barred from competition a few years prior.

Legal issues
In 2015, it was reported that Carter had an arrest warrant issued to him and wife Dana Upright Royal for tax evasion; both were later arrested in August later that year. When Carter initially announced his intentions for his team to return to the ARCA series in 2016, it was revealed that Carter had been banned from competition due to his outstanding warrants.

In 2019, both Carters would be sentenced to two to fifteen years in prison in Michigan for operating a fake RV business front and committing fraud.

Motorsports results

ARCA Racing Series
(key) (Bold – Pole position awarded by qualifying time. Italics – Pole position earned by points standings or practice time. * – Most laps led.)

References

1969 births
Living people
NASCAR drivers
ARCA Menards Series drivers
Racing drivers from Michigan
People from Eaton County, Michigan